Lazar Dobrić also known as Laza Harambaša also spelled Harambascha(Serbian: Лазар Добрић или (or) Лаза Харамбаша; Batajnica c. 1755–1805) was a Serbian hajduk who went by the name of Laza Harambaša and was widely-known in two empires, Ottoman and Habsburg as a Räuberhauptmann.

Lazar Dobrić was a hajduk leader, he mostly stayed in Srem (then part of the Habsburg monarchy) but also along the coast of the Sava and the Danube rivers and surrounding regions of Ottoman-occupied territories. He is remembered as a hajduk who robbed Turkish and Austrian merchants and often distributed part of the spoils, especially wheat, flour, and other goods, to the people. The legend of Laza Harambaša has some similarities with the story of Robin Hood, but it also has many more real foundations. He established a fortress surrounded by trenches on an island called Čakljanac which was his haven when Austrian or Ottoman authorities went to search for him. He was never caught.

It is well documented that Stanoje Glavaš and Hajduk Veljko learned their fighting skills in his company, and Karađorđe was also in his ranks.

Lazar Dobrić was married to Pelagija Vujković.

Legacy
In 2018 a statue of his likeness was erected in Novi Karlovci.

He was memorialized in the writings of Dušan J. Popović, Ignjat Sopron, and Sreten Popović.

References 

1750s births
1805 deaths
Year of birth uncertain